The men's 73 kilograms competition at the 2021 World Weightlifting Championships was held on 10 December 2021.

Schedule

Medalists

Records

Results

References

Results

Men's 73 kg